The 1997 Gerry Weber Open was a men's tennis tournament played on outdoor grass courts. It was the 5th edition of the Gerry Weber Open, and was part of the World Series of the 1997 ATP Tour. It took place at the Gerry Weber Stadion in Halle, North Rhine-Westphalia, Germany, from 9 June through 15 June 1997. First-seeded Yevgeny Kafelnikov won the singles title.

Finals

Singles

 Yevgeny Kafelnikov defeated  Petr Korda 7–6, 6–7, 7–6
 It was Kafelnikov's 1st singles title of the year and the 12th of his career.

Doubles

 Karsten Braasch /  Michael Stich defeated  David Adams /  Marius Barnard 7–6, 6–3

It was Braasch's first title of his career. It was Stich's first title of the year and the 28th of his career.

References

External links
 Official website 
 ITF tournament edition details

 
Gerry Weber Open
Halle Open
1997 in German tennis